Vinayaditya, an able Jain king of the Hoysala Empire, who distinguished himself as an able feudatory of the Kalyani Chalukyas during his long reign. He helped bring many small Malnad chiefs like the Kongalvas, Chengalvas, Santharas of Humcha Shimoga and the Kadambas of Bayalnadu (Vainadu) under control. After the complete disappearance of the  Gangas during Chola occupation of Gangavadi, Vinayaditya brought some small portions of Gangavadi under his control. He was either a brother-in-law or father-in-law of Chalukya Someshvara I.

Vinayaditya conquered and ruled over South Kanara and Mysore. He was a great builder of cities and towns. He was succeeded by his grandson Veera Ballala I as Vinayaditya's son Ereyanga had predeceased him.

Notes

References
 Suryanath U. Kamath, A Concise History of Karnataka from Pre-historic Times to the Present, Jupiter books, MCC, Bangalore, 1980 (Reprinted 2001, 2002) OCLC: 7796041

1098 deaths
Hoysala kings
Year of birth unknown
11th-century Indian monarchs